Cladonia ahtii is a species of cup lichen in the family Cladoniaceae. It is found in Brazil, and grows in tropical moist broadleaf forests. The specific epithet honours Finnish lichenologist Teuvo Ahti.

References

ahtii
Lichen species
Lichens of Brazil
Lichens described in 1899